Ardmore GAA is a Gaelic Athletic Association club based in the West Waterford town of Ardmore, Ireland. The club plays both hurling and gaelic football. It is generally thought to focus more on Gaelic football, having won 2 Senior Football Championships in 1965 and 1977. Recently the club has put more effort into hurling, winning the Waterford Intermediate Hurling Championship for the first time in 2002.

Notable players
Clinton Hennessy
Declan Prendergast
Séamus Prendergast

History

Honours
 All-Ireland Junior Club Hurling Championships:  1
 2018
 Waterford Senior Hurling Championships: 0
 Munster Junior Club Hurling Championships: 1
 2017
 Waterford Junior Hurling Championship: (3) 
 1979, 2001, 2017
 Waterford Senior Football Championships: 2
 1965, 1977
 Waterford Intermediate Football Championship: (2)
 1972, 1997
 Waterford Intermediate Hurling Championship (2)
 2002, 2013
 Waterford Junior Football Championship (1)
 1961
 Waterford Under-21 Hurling Championship (1)
 2000    | Runner-Up 2001
  Waterford Under-21 Football Championship (3)
 2000, 2001, 2002
 Waterford Minor Football Championship: (4)
 1966, 1997, 1998, 1999   | Runners-Up 1962, 1965, 1996

References

Gaelic games clubs in County Waterford
Hurling clubs in County Waterford
Gaelic football clubs in County Waterford